Te amo (English title:I love you) is a Mexican telenovela produced by Guillermo Diazayas and directed by Enrique Segoviano for Televisa in 1984. It starred Lourdes Munguía, José Roberto, Aarón Hernán, María Rubio and Norma Lazareno.

Cast 
Lourdes Munguía as Verónica
José Roberto as Fernando 
Aarón Hernán as Matías 
María Rubio as Consuelo 
Norma Lazareno as Victoria 
Porfirio Baz as Esteban 
Beatriz Martínez as Regina 
Marta Aura as Mercedes 
Felipe Gil as Bernardo 
Adalberto Menéndez as Carlos 
Júlio Augurio as CristóbalDolores Beristáin as AídaRicardo de León as GabrielMarisa De Lille as SusanaElizabeth Dupeyrón 
Sonia Esquivel as GladysAlberto Gavira as CastilloKokin Li as El ChaleJulio Monterde as HumbertoMorenita as Gloria 
Elsie Méndez as Lucila 
Mercedes Navarro as LeticiaMercedes Olea as Julia 
Patricia Renteria as Magda 
Carmen Rodríguez de la Vega as Patricia 
Nallely Saldivar as Claudia 
Luz Elena Silva as María ElenaAlejandra Ávalos as Cecilia''

References

External links

1984 telenovelas
Mexican telenovelas
1984 Mexican television series debuts
1984 Mexican television series endings
Televisa telenovelas
Spanish-language telenovelas